The House of Lehndorff is the name of an old German noble family from former East Prussia, first recorded in 1236. Members of the family occupied many important military positions within the Kingdom of Prussia. They held the title of Imperial Count, granted to them on 23.2.1687 by Leopold I, Holy Roman Emperor.

Notable members
 Meinhard von Lehndorff (1590–1639), Landrat of Rastenburg
 Gerhard Ahasverus Graf von Lehndorff (1637–1688), author
 Ernst Ahasverus Graf von Lehndorff (1688–1727)
 Ernst Ahasverus Heinrich Graf von Lehndorff (1727–1811), Royal Prussian Kammerherr
 Karl Friedrich Ludwig Graf von Lehndorff (1770–1854), Prussian General of the Napoleonic Wars 
 Heinrich Graf Ahasverus Otto Magnus von Lehndorff (1829–1905), Generaladjutant of Kaiser Wilhelm I
 Georg Graf von Lehndorff (1833–1914), Hippologist
 Siegfried Graf Lehndorff (1869–1956), Hippologist, head of Trakehner stud
 Hans Graf von Lehndorff (1910–1987), surgeon and author
 Manfred Graf Ahasverus Wilhelm Heinrich Bernd von Lehndorff, (1883–1962) 
 Heinrich Graf von Lehndorff-Steinort (1909–1944), resistance fighter
 Veruschka von Lehndorff (born 1939), artist

References

German noble families